Phosphorus sesquisulfide is the inorganic compound with the formula . It was developed by Henri Sevene and Emile David Cahen in 1898 as part of their invention of friction matches that did not pose the health hazards of white phosphorus. This yellow solid is one of two commercially produced phosphorus sulfides. It is a component of "strike anywhere" matches.

Depending on purity, samples can appear yellow-green to grey. The compound was discovered by G. Lemoine and first produced safely in commercial quantities in 1898 by Albright and Wilson. It dissolves in an equal weight of carbon disulfide, and in a 1:50 weight ratio of benzene. Unlike some other phosphorus sulfides,  is slow to hydrolyze and has a well-defined melting point.

Structure and synthesis
The molecule has C3v symmetry. It is a derivative of the tetrahedral unit from insertion of sulfur into three P-P bonds. The P-S and P-P distances are 2.090 and 2.235 Å, respectively.  and  adopt the same structures. These compounds can be melted together and form mixed crystals of one dissolved in the other. Under higher temperatures, mixed chalcogenide molecules  and  will form.

 is produced by the reaction of red or white phosphorus with sulfur. Excess sulfur gives phosphorus pentasulfide. It is estimated that 150 ton/y were produced in 1989.

Applications
 and potassium chlorate, together with other materials, composes the heads of "strike-anywhere matches".

Safety
Its flash point is about 100 °C.

Health effects
Exposure to "strike anywhere" matches containing phosphorus sesquisulfide can cause contact dermatitis, usually in the pocket area but also on the face. Exposure over a long period of time to burning match tips (containing phosphorus
sesquisulfide) can result in a recurring severe primary dermatitis about the eyes and face. Loosening of the teeth has also been reported which may have been due to phosphorus poisoning.

References

This article contains public domain text from the NOAA as cited.

Inorganic phosphorus compounds
Sulfides